Kazakhstan first participated at the Olympic Games as an independent nation in 1994, and has sent athletes to compete in every Games since then.  Prior to the dissolution of the Soviet Union, Kazakh athletes competed as part of the Soviet Union at the Olympics, and were also part of the Unified Team in 1992.

The National Olympic Committee of Kazakhstan was created in 1990 and recognized in 1993.

Medals

Medals by Summer Games

Medals by Winter Games

Medals by Summer Sport

Medals by Winter Sport

List of medalists

Summer Olympics

Winter Olympics

Upgraded Medalists

 Nurbakyt Tengizbayev from bronze to silver (Wrestling at the 2008 Summer Olympics – Men's Greco-Roman 60 kg)
 Alla Vazhenina from silver to gold (Weightlifting at the 2008 Summer Olympics – Women's 75 kg)
 Olga Rypakova from 4th place to silver (Athletics at the 2008 Summer Olympics – Women's triple jump)
 Anna Nurmukhambetova from 4th place to silver (Weightlifting at the 2012 Summer Olympics – Women's 69 kg)
 Daulet Shabanbay from 5th place to bronze (Wrestling at the 2012 Summer Olympics – Men's freestyle 120 kg)
 Denis Ulanov from 4th place to bronze (Weightlifting at the 2016 Summer Olympics – Men's 85 kg)

Disqualified Medalists

The athletes from Kazakhstan listed below tested positive for doping and were stripped of their medals.

See also
 List of flag bearers for Kazakhstan at the Olympics
 :Category:Olympic competitors for Kazakhstan
 Kazakhstan at the Paralympics
 List of Kazakhs

References

External links